Zingerone, also called vanillylacetone, is a major flavor component of ginger, providing the sweet flavor of cooked ginger. Zingerone is a crystalline solid that is sparingly soluble in water and soluble in ether. 

Zingerone is similar in chemical structure to other flavor chemicals such as vanillin and eugenol. It is used as a flavor additive in spice oils and in perfumery to introduce spicy aromas.

Fresh ginger does not contain zingerone, but it is produced by cooking or drying of the ginger root, which causes a reverse aldol reaction on gingerol.

Production

History 
Zingerone was first isolated from the ginger root in 1917 by Hiroshi Nomura, a chemistry professor at Tokyo Imperial University. Nomura named the compound and identified the empirical formula of zingerone in his studies at the laboratory of the Agricultural College. He initially identified it as the chemical component contributing pungency to ginger, something further work has disproven.

Current methods 
Nomura identified and later patented a method for the synthesis of zingerone, in which vanillin and acetone are reacted under basic conditions to form dehydrozingerone. This compound is obtained in about 95% quantity. This reaction is followed by catalytic hydrogenation of the intermediate compound in order to form zingerone, obtained in approximately 100% quantity.

Biological effects

Ginger compounds have been shown to be active against enterotoxigenic Escherichia coli heat-labile enterotoxin-induced diarrhea. This type of diarrhea is the leading cause of infant death in developing countries. Zingerone is likely the active constituent responsible for the antidiarrheal efficacy of ginger.

Zingerone is recognized as being a particularly efficient free radical scavenger. It is able to scavenge and degrade free radicals and reactive oxygen species in the body, and inhibits enzymes involved in the generation of these reactive oxygen species.

It is used by some flowers to attract pollinating fruit flies by mimicking the sex pheromone of the fly.

References 

O-methylated natural phenols
Pungent flavors
Ginger